In physics, the Gaudin model, sometimes known as the quantum Gaudin model, is a model, or a large class of models, in statistical mechanics first described in its simplest case by Michel Gaudin. They are exactly solvable models, and are also examples of quantum spin chains.

History 
The simplest case was first described by Michel Gaudin in 1976, with the associated Lie algebra taken to be , the two-dimensional special linear group.

Mathematical formulation 
Let  be a semi-simple Lie algebra of finite dimension .

Let  be a positive integer. On the complex plane , choose  different points, .

Denote by  the finite-dimensional irreducible representation of  corresponding to the dominant integral element . Define the tensor product .

They are described as follows.

Then

These operators are mutually commuting. One problem of interest in the theory of Gaudin models is finding simultaneous eigenvectors and eigenvalues of these operators.

Instead of working with the multiple Gaudin Hamiltonians, there is another operator , sometimes referred to as the Gaudin Hamiltonian. It depends on a complex parameter , and also on the  quadratic Casimir, which is an element of the universal enveloping algebra , defined as

This acts on representations  by multiplying by a number dependent on the representation, denoted . This is sometimes referred to as the index of the representation. The Gaudin Hamiltonian is then defined

Higher Gaudin Hamiltonians 
When  has rank greater than 1, the commuting algebra spanned by the Gaudin Hamiltonians and the identity can be expanded to a larger commuting algebra, known as the Gaudin algebra. Similarly to the Harish-Chandra isomorphism, these commuting elements have associated degrees. For , the Gaudin Hamiltonians and the identity span the Gaudin algebra. There is another commuting algebra which is 'universal', underlying the Gaudin algebra for any choice of sites and weights, called the Feigin–Frenkel center. See here.

Then eigenvectors of the Gaudin algebra define linear functionals on the algebra. If  is an element of the Gaudin algebra , and  an eigenvector of the Gaudin algebra, one obtains a linear functional  given by

The linear functional  is called a character of the Gaudin algebra. Determining eigenvalues then becomes a matter of determining characters on the Gaudin algebra.

Solutions 
A solution to a Gaudin model often means determining the spectrum of the Gaudin Hamiltonian or Gaudin Hamiltonians. There are several methods of solution, including
  Algebraic Bethe ansatz, used by Gaudin
 Separation of variables, used by  Sklyanin
 Correlation functions, using a method described by Feigin, Frenkel and Reshetikhin.
 Opers

Algebraic Bethe ansatz

For sl2 
For , let  be the standard basis. For any , one can define the operator-valued meromorphic function

The  and  satisfy several useful properties
 
 
 
but the  do not form a representation: .

For an  Gaudin model specified by sites  and weights , define the vacuum vector to be the tensor product of the highest weight states from each representation: .

A Bethe vector (of spin deviation ) is a vector of the form

Guessing eigenvectors of the form of Bethe vectors is the Bethe ansatz. It can be shown that a Bethe vector is an eigenvector of the Gaudin Hamiltonians if the set of equations

These are the Bethe ansatz equations for spin deviation . For , this reduces to

Completeness

In theory, the Bethe ansatz equations can be solved to give the eigenvectors and eigenvalues of the Gaudin Hamiltonian. In practice, if the equations are to completely solve the spectral problem, one must also check
 The number of solutions predicted by the Bethe equations
 The multiplicity of solutions
If, for a specific configuration of sites and weights, the Bethe ansatz generates all eigenvectors, then it is said to be complete for that configuration of Gaudin model. It is possible to construct examples of Gaudin models which are incomplete. One problem in the theory of Gaudin models is then to determine when a given configuration is complete or not, or at least characterize the 'space of models' for which the Bethe ansatz is complete.

For general complex simple g 
Analogues of the Bethe ansatz equation can be derived for Lie algebras of higher rank. However, these are much more difficult to derive and solve than the  case.

Generalizations 
There exist generalizations arising from weakening the restriction on  being a strictly semi-simple Lie algebra. For example, when  is allowed to be an affine Lie algebra, the model is called an affine Gaudin model.

A different way to generalize is to pick out a preferred automorphism of a particular Lie algebra . One can then define Hamiltonians which transform nicely under the action of the automorphism. One class of such models are cyclotomic Gaudin models.

There is also a notion of classical Gaudin model. Historically, the quantum Gaudin model was defined and studied first, unlike most physical systems. Certain classical integrable field theories can be viewed as classical dihedral affine Gaudin models. Therefore, understanding quantum affine Gaudin models may allow understanding of the integrable structure of quantum integrable field theories.

Such classical field theories include the principal chiral model, coset sigma models and affine Toda field theory.

References

External links 
 Gaudin integrable model in nLab

Spin models